

A Memory Technology Device (MTD) is a type of device file in Linux for interacting with flash memory.  The MTD subsystem was created to provide an abstraction layer between the hardware-specific device drivers and higher-level applications.  Although character and block device files already existed, their semantics don't map well to the way that flash memory devices operate.

USB sticks, MMCs, SDs, CompactFlashes and other popular removable devices are not MTDs. Although they contain flash memory, this is hidden behind a block device interface using a Flash Translation Layer and not directly interfacing with the OS.

When using an MTD, the use of an MTD aware file system such as UBIFS, JFFS2 or YAFFS is recommended. The MTD subsystem exports block devices as well, which allows the use of common filesystem like ext4. However, using an MTD this way is not recommended since there is neither detection of bad blocks nor any kind of wear leveling.

MTDs don't address to the OS like traditional storage devices (Solid State Drive, Hard Disk Drive...) using LBAs, but rather using offsets and sizes.

References

Further reading

External links 
 http://www.linux-mtd.infradead.org

Solid-state computer storage media
Linux kernel features